Zino (1979–1991) was a Thoroughbred racehorse which won the 2000 Guineas Stakes in 1982.

Owned by Gerry Oldham, trained by François Boutin and ridden by Freddie Head, Zino won the 1982 2000 Guineas Stakes at Newmarket, England, beating Wind and Wuthering in a photo-finish, in a time of 1:37.13. Zino is one of eleven winners of the 2000 Guineas to have been trained in France since 1900.

Pedigree

Zino was inbred 4 x 4 to Owen Tudor, meaning that this stallion appears twice in the fourth generation of his pedigree.

References

External links
Zino's pedigree and partial racing stats

1979 racehorse births
1991 racehorse deaths
Racehorses bred in the United Kingdom
Racehorses trained in France
Thoroughbred family 1-n
2000 Guineas winners